Joan Llaneras Rosselló (born 17 May 1969 in Porreres, Majorca) is a former Spanish World and Olympic points race champion track cyclist. He specialises in the madison and points race events.

Llaneras began his cycling career on the road with the ONCE professional cycling team but switched to concentrate on track cycling. Llaneras is a four-time world champion in the points race and three-time champion in the Madison. He is a double Olympic champion, winning the event at the 2000 Summer Olympics in Sydney and in Beijing in 2008.

Llaneras teamed up with Isaac Gálvez to compete on the lucrative Six Days of Ghent racing circuit in November 2006. It resulted with the death of Gálvez after colliding with Dimitri De Fauw and hitting the railings. Llaneras had decided to quit cycling, but a few months later in an interview with Spanish daily newspaper Marca, he said:  He returned to competition in 2007, and although he had no intention of returning to Madison racing, Llaneras teamed up with Antonio Tauler to take the silver medal in the Madison at the 2008 Summer Olympics, adding to the gold he won in the points race three days earlier. In doing so, he became the Spaniard with the most Olympic medals ever, with 2 gold and 2 silver to his name. After the Beijing Olympics, Llaneras retired.

Major results

1991
2nd GP Libération (NED)

1993
1st Stage 1, Vuelta a Andalucia (Ruta del Sol), Chicania (ESP)

1994
2nd Platja d'Aro (ESP)
1st Trofeo Mallorca (ESP)

1995
1st Platja d'Aro (ESP)

1996
1st  Points race, World Track Championships

1997
1st  Madison, World Track Championships (with Miquel Alzamora Riera)
3rd Points race, World Track Championships
3rd Medellin, Six Days (COL)
3rd Zürich, Six Days (SUI)

1998
3rd Alconbendas (ESP)
2nd Cali, Madison, Cali (COL)
1st Cali, Points race, Cali (COL)
2nd Victoria, Madison, Victoria (CAN)
1st  Points race, World Track Championships

1999
1st  Madison, World Track Championships (with Isaac Gálvez)
3rd Six-Days of Grenoble (FRA)
1st Mexico City, Madison (MEX) (with Miquel Alzamora Riera)
3rd Cali, Team Pursuit, Cali (COL)
1st Cali, Madison, Cali (COL) (with Miquel Alzamora Riera)

2000
1st  Points race, World Track Championships
2nd Madison, World Track Championships
2nd Zaragoza (ESP)
2nd Zürich, Six Days (SUI)
1st Olympic Games, Track, Points race, Elite, Sydney
2nd Buenos-Aires Six Days (ARG)
1st Six-Days of Grenoble (FRA) (with Isaac Gálvez

2001
2nd Madison, World Track Championships
2nd Hof (GER)

2003
2nd Points race, World Track Championships
2nd Moscou, Points race (RUS)
2nd Aguascalientes, Madison (MEX)
3rd Cape Town, Madison (RSA)

2004
1st Manchester, Points race (GBR)
1st Points race, Spanish National Track Championships - U23
2nd Sydney, Madison (AUS)
3rd Sydney, Points race (AUS)
2nd Points race, Olympic Games

2005
3rd Points race, World Track Championships

2006
1st  Madison, World Track Championships (with Isaac Gálvez)
3rd Los Angeles, Points race (USA)
3rd Madison, Spanish National Track Championships
2nd Amsterdam, Six Days (NED)

2007
1st  Points race, World Track Championships
3rd Fiorenzuola d' Arda, Six Days (ITA)
2nd Madison, Sydney (AUS)

2008
1st Points race, Olympic Games
2nd Madison, Olympic Games

References

External links

1969 births
Living people
Spanish male cyclists
UCI Track Cycling World Champions (men)
Cyclists at the 1996 Summer Olympics
Cyclists at the 2000 Summer Olympics
Cyclists at the 2004 Summer Olympics
Cyclists at the 2008 Summer Olympics
Olympic cyclists of Spain
Olympic gold medalists for Spain
Olympic silver medalists for Spain
Sportspeople from Mallorca
Olympic medalists in cycling
Medalists at the 2008 Summer Olympics
Medalists at the 2004 Summer Olympics
Medalists at the 2000 Summer Olympics
Spanish track cyclists
Cyclists from the Balearic Islands